Sandra Citte (born 28 March 1976 in Saint-Claude, Guadeloupe) is a French athlete who specialises in the 100 meters. Citte competed at the 1996 Summer Olympics and 2000 Summer Olympics

References 
 sports reference

French female sprinters
Guadeloupean female sprinters
Olympic athletes of France
French people of Guadeloupean descent
Living people
Athletes (track and field) at the 2000 Summer Olympics
Athletes (track and field) at the 1996 Summer Olympics
1976 births
Olympic female sprinters